San Hing Tsuen is a village in Lam Tei, Tuen Mun District, Hong Kong.

Administration
San Hing Tsuen is a recognized village under the New Territories Small House Policy. It is one of the 36 villages represented within the Tuen Mun Rural Committee. For electoral purposes, San Hing Tsuen is part of the Yan Tin constituency.

See also
 Tuen Tsz Wai, a village adjacent to San Hing Tsuen (north east)
 Tsz Tin Tsuen, a village adjacent to San Hing Tsuen (south west)

References

External links

 Delineation of area of existing village San Hing Tsuen (Tuen Mun) for election of resident representative (2019 to 2022)

Villages in Tuen Mun District, Hong Kong
Lam Tei